Classica is a French classical music magazine founded in 1998. It is published on a monthly basis. The reviews sections awards Choc-Classica recommendations to selected recordings while the annual record awards of the magazine are called the Chocs de l'année. It was owned by the Roularta Media Group until January 2015 when it was acquired by French businessman Patrick Drahi. 

In 2013 the circulation of Classica was 26,599 copies.

References

External links

1998 establishments in France
Classical music magazines
French-language magazines
Magazines established in 1998
Monthly magazines published in France
Music magazines published in France